The 2010 Triglav Trophy was held between March 31 and April 4, 2010. It was an international figure skating competition held annually in Jesenice, Slovenia. Skaters competed in the disciplines of men's and ladies' singles across the levels of senior, junior, and novice.

Medalists

Senior results

Men

Ladies

Junior results

Men

Ladies

Novice results

Boys

Girls

External links
 2010 Triglav Trophy results (Archived)

Triglav Trophy, 2010
Triglav Trophy